49 may refer to: 
 49 (number)
 "Forty Nine", a song by Karma to Burn from the album V, 2011
 one of the years 49 BC, AD 49, 1949, 2049